Keetley is a surname, and may refer to:

 Charlie Keetley (1906–1979), English footballer
 Frank Keetley (1901–1968), English footballer 
 Harold Keetley (born 1903), English footballer
 Joe Keetley (1897–1958), English footballer
 Matt Keetley (born 1986),  Canadian ice hockey player
 Tom Keetley (1898–1958), English footballer

See also
Keetley, Utah, ghost town